Tydeus domesticus is a species of mite belonging to the genus Tydeus.

References

Trombidiformes
Animals described in 1933